Bocharov and Bocharova are respectively male and female Slavic occupational surnames derived from Bochar (бочар) which means cooper.

Males with the name
 Alexander Bocharov (born 1975), Russian professional road bicycle racer
 Andrey Bocharov (born 1969), Russian politician
 Anton Bocharov (born 1995), Russian footballer
 Dmitry Bocharov (born 1982), Russian chess grandmaster
 Mélovin, (Kostyantyn Bocharov, born 1997), Ukrainian singer
 Mikhail Bocharov (1872–1936), Russian opera singer
 Nikita Bocharov (born 1992), Russian footballer
 Petko Bocharov (1919–2016), Bulgarian journalist and translator
 Stanislav Bocharov (born 1991), Russian ice hockey player

Females with the name
 Aleksandra Bocharova (born 1943), Russian rower
 Nina Bocharova (1924–2020), Soviet/Ukrainian gymnast
 Tatyana Bocharova (born 1974), Kazakhstani triple jumper

See also

 Bocharov Ruchey, the summer residence of the President of Russia

Russian-language surnames